Elena Vystropova (born 3 November 1988, Sulak, Russia) is a Russian-born Azerbaijani female boxer. At the 2012 Summer Olympics, she competed in the Women's middleweight competition, but was defeated in the first round.

References

External links
 

1988 births
Living people
Sportspeople from Makhachkala
Russian emigrants to Azerbaijan
Naturalized citizens of Azerbaijan
Russian women boxers
Azerbaijani women boxers
Olympic boxers of Azerbaijan
Boxers at the 2012 Summer Olympics
AIBA Women's World Boxing Championships medalists
European Games competitors for Azerbaijan
Boxers at the 2015 European Games
Middleweight boxers